Between May 2009 and May 2014, the KwaZulu-Natal Legislature, the official legislature of the KwaZulu-Natal province of South Africa, consisted of 80 members from six different political parties, elected on 22 April 2009 in the 2009 South African general election. For the first time ever, the African National Congress (ANC) won an outright majority of 51 seats in the legislature, an increase of 13 seats from the previous legislature elected in 2004. 

The Inkatha Freedom Party (IFP) lost 12 seats but, with 18 seats, remained the second-largest party in the legislature. The Democratic Alliance (DA) and Minority Front (MF) retained their earlier seat allocations, with seven and two seats respectively. The African Christian Democratic Party (ACDP) held a single seat, a decrease of one seat from the previous legislature, while the new Congress of the People (COPE) also earned a single seat. The United Democratic Movement (UDM) lost its seat in the legislature and was not represented.

Members of the 5th Provincial Legislature took office on 6 May 2009 and served until the general election of 7 May 2014. The ANC's Zweli Mkhize was elected Premier at the legislature's first sitting, but he was replaced by Senzo Mchunu in August 2013. Likewise, Peggy Nkonyeni, also of the ANC, was elected Speaker of the legislature in 2009 but was replaced by Lydia Johnson in October 2013.

Composition 
This is a graphical comparison of party strengths as they were in the 5th KwaZulu-Natal Legislature.

 Note this is not the official seating plan of the KwaZulu-Natal Legislature.

|-style="background:#e9e9e9;"
!colspan="2" style="text-align:left"| Party !! style="text-align:center"| Seats 
|-
|  || 51
|-
|  || 18 
|-
|  || 7 
|-
|  || 2
|-
|  || 1 
|-
|  || 1
|-
|colspan="2" style="text-align:left"| Total || style="text-align:right"| 80
|}

Members 
This table depicts the list of members of the 5th KwaZulu-Natal Legislature as elected in the election of 22 April 2009. Members of the Provincial Legislature (MPLs) are elected through a system of party-list proportional representation with closed lists.

References 

Legislature